The following numbered county roads exist in DeSoto County, Florida. As with most Florida counties, numbers are assigned in a statewide grid.

County road list

References

FDOT map of DeSoto County, Florida
FDOT GIS data, accessed January 2014

 
County